The Keystone Central School District (KCSD) is a midsized rural, public school district based in Lock Haven, Pennsylvania that includes public schools in Clinton County, and that serves students in Clinton County, Centre County, and Potter County.It encompasses approximately  square miles. According to 2000 federal census data, it served a resident population of 36,950. By 2010, the district's population was 37,794 people, making it a district of the third class. The educational attainment levels for the school district population (25 years old and over) were  85.7% high school graduates and 17.2% college graduates. The district is one of the 500 public school districts of Pennsylvania.

According to the Pennsylvania Budget and Policy Center, 51.7% of the district's pupils lived at 185% or below the Federal Poverty Level as shown by their eligibility for the federal free or reduced price school meal programs in 2012. In 2013 the Pennsylvania Department of Education, reported that 71 students in the Keystone Central School District were homeless.

In 2009, Keystone Central School District residents’ per capita income was $15,619, while the median family income was $37,532. In the Commonwealth, the median family income was $49,501  and the United States median family income was $49,445, in 2010. In Clinton County, the median household income was $42,184. By 2013, the median household income in the United States rose to $52,100. In 2014, the median household income in the USA was $53,700.

Keystone Central School District operates 5 elementary schools, three secondary schools (one middle school, one high school, and one combined middle and high school), an alternative education program, a career technology center and a cyber academy.

High school students may choose to attend the Keystone Central Career Technology Center (KCCTC) for training in the construction and mechanical trades. The Central Intermediate Unit IU10 provides the district with a wide variety of services like specialized education for disabled students and hearing, background checks for employees, state-mandated recognizing and reporting child abuse training, speech and visual disability services and criminal background check processing for prospective employees and professional development for staff and faculty.

Schools

Elementary schools
Liberty-Curtin Elementary School
 11125 North Eagle Valley Rd.Blanchard, Pennsylvania 16826
Mill Hall Elementary School
 210 Kyler Ave.Mill Hall, Pennsylvania 17751
 Renovo Elementary School
 1301 Bucktail Av.Renovo, Pennsylvania 17764

Robb Elementary School
 400 E. Church St.Lock Haven, Pennsylvania 17745
 Woodward Elementary School
 35 King St.Lock Haven, Pennsylvania 17745

Secondary schools
Central Mountain High School (9-12)
Central Mountain Middle School (5-8)
Bucktail High School (9-12)
Bucktail Area Middle School (6-8)

Extracurriculars
Keystone Central School District offers a variety of clubs, activities and an extensive sports program. Keystone Central School Board determines eligibility policies to participate in these programs.

Sports
The district funds:

Central Mountain High School

Boys
Baseball - AAAA
Basketball- AAAA
Cross country - AAA
Football - AAAA
Golf - AAA
Soccer - AAA
Swimming and diving - AAA
Tennis - AAA
Track and field - AAA
Wrestling - AAA

Girls
Basketball - AAAA
Cross country - AAA
Golf - AAA
Soccer - AAA
Softball - AAAA
Swimming and diving - AAA
Tennis - AAA
Track and field - AA
Volleyball

CM Middle school sports

Boys
Basketball
Football
Soccer
Track and field
Wrestling 

Girls
Basketball
Soccer
Softball 
Track and field

Bucktail Area High School

Boys
Baseball - A
Basketball- A
Football - A

Girls
Basketball - A
Softball- A
Tennis - AA

Bucktail Junior High School

Boys
Basketball
Football
Wrestling 

Girls
Basketball
Softball 

According to PIAA directory July 2015

References

External links
Keystone Central School District

School districts in Clinton County, Pennsylvania
School districts in Centre County, Pennsylvania
School districts in Potter County, Pennsylvania